André Göransson and David Pel were the defending champions but chose not to defend their title.

Radu Albot and Alexander Cozbinov won the title after defeating Antonio Šančić and Artem Sitak 4–6, 7–5, [11–9] in the final.

Seeds

Draw

References

External links
 Main draw

Amex-Istanbul Challenger II - Doubles
2021 Doubles 2